The Murung people are an ethnic group living in the Chittagong Hill Tracts of Bangladesh and India. They practice jhum (slash-and-burn) agriculture. Their total population was 16,000 in 1980.

References

Ethnic groups in Bangladesh
Chittagong society